Santa María La Antigua Catholic University (USMA) is a private university in Panama City, Panama. It was established in 1965 as the first private university in Panama. As of 2021, it had 5,879 students, with more than 80 academic programs in both undergraduate and graduate degrees.

History 
Founded on May 27, 1965 as the first private university in Panama by Rev. P. Benjamín Ayechu, the university began its academic activities in the Cathedral Park, in what was formerly the Archbishop's Palace, with 232 students, 9 majors and 21 professors.

Since 1976, the university has moved to its current campus, on Avenida Ricardo J. Alfaro. It also has four offices, in Colón, Chiriquí, Azuero and Veraguas.

In 2012, the National Council for University Evaluation and Accreditation of Panama (CONEAUPA), declared it as one of the accredited universities in the country.

Campuses 
 Panama City
 Colón
 David, Chiriquí
 Chitré, Herrera
 Santiago, Veraguas

External links
USMA Website

References

Universities in Panama
Buildings and structures in Panama City
Education in Panama City